The Roman Catholic Diocese of Annecy (Latin: Dioecesis Anneciensis; French: Diocèse d'Annecy) is a diocese of the Latin Church of the Roman Catholic Church in France. Saint-Gingolph VS, a town in the Swiss canton of Valais, is also part of the diocese. Originally erected in 1822, after the Concordat as a subdivision of the Roman Catholic Archdiocese of Chambéry, the diocese comprises the entirety of the department of Haute-Savoie in the Region of Rhône-Alpes. Only recently, in 2002, did the metropolitan change. The diocese is now suffragan to the Archdiocese of Lyon. The current bishop is Yves Le Saux, appointed in 2022.
 
As of 2015 there was one priest for every 3,279 Catholics.

History
From 1535 to 1801 the bishops of Geneva, exiled by the Reformation from Geneva, lived at Annecy. St. Francis de Sales was Bishop of Annecy from 1602 to 1622. From 1801 to 1822, Annecy belonged to the Diocese of Chambéry and Geneva, but was made an episcopal see 15 February 1822, by the papal bull Sollicita catholici gregis.

The memory of St. Bernard of Menthon, founder of the hospice of the Grand St. Bernard, is still honoured in the Diocese of Annecy. St. Francis de Sales and St. Jane Frances de Chantal founded the Congregation of the Visitation at Annecy in 1610; at the death of its foundress the convents belonging to this order numbered 87. The relics of these saints are preserved in the Church of the Visitation at Annecy. The ancient Benedictine abbey of Talloires is near the Lac d'Annecy.

Bishops of Annecy
Claude-François de Thiollaz (21 Apr 1822 Appointed – 14 Mar 1832 Died) 
Pierre-Joseph Rey (13 Jun 1832 Appointed – 31 Jan 1842 Died) 
Louis Rendu (25 Aug 1842 Appointed – 28 Aug 1859 Died) 
Charles-Marie Magnin (11 Dec 1860 Appointed – 14 Jan 1879 Died) 
Louis-Romain-Ernest Isoard (9 May 1879 Appointed – 3 Aug 1901 Died) 
Pierre-Lucien Campistron (13 May 1902 Appointed – 22 Aug 1921 Died) 
Florent-Michel-Marie-Joseph du Bois de la Villerabel (21 Nov 1921 Appointed – 11 May 1940 Appointed, Archbishop of Aix) 
Auguste-Léon-Alexis Cesbron (30 Sep 1940 Appointed – 13 Jul 1962 Died) 
Jean-Baptiste-Étienne Sauvage (28 Sep 1962 Appointed – 27 Sep 1983 Retired) 
Hubert Marie Pierre Dominique Barbier (19 May 1984 Appointed – 25 Apr 2000 Appointed, Archbishop of Bourges) 
Yves Boivineau (7 May 2001 Appointed – 27 Jun 2022 Retired)
Yves Le Saux (27 Jun 2022 Appointed – present)

See also
Catholic Church in France
List of Catholic dioceses in France

References

Bibliography

Reference works
  (Use with caution; obsolete)

Studies

 *

External links
  Centre national des Archives de l'Église de France, L’Épiscopat francais depuis 1919, retrieved: 2016-12-24.
Catholic Hierarchy 
GCatholic.org

Roman Catholic dioceses in France
1822 establishments in France